Hodges is a surname of English origin. Notable people with the surname include:

Arts and entertainment
 Augustus M. Hodges (1854–1916), American journalist, newspaper editor, poet, and political organizer 
 C. Walter Hodges (1909–2004), English illustrator and author
 Chas Hodges (1943–2018), English musician and singer, of the duo Chas & Dave
 David Hodges (born 1978), American songwriter, producer, composer, keyboardist and vocalist
 Eddie Hodges (born 1947), American former child actor and recording artist
 Edward Hodges (1796–1867), English organist and composer
 Faustina Hasse Hodges (1822–1895), English-American organist and composer
 Jessy Hodges, American actress
 Jim Hodges (artist) (born 1957), New York-based installation artist
 John Hodges (minstrel) (1821–1891), early blackface minstrel entertainer
 Johnny Hodges (1906–1970), American alto saxophonist
 Jordon Hodges (born 1987), American actor
 Leigh Mitchell Hodges (1876-1954), American journalist, author, poet, and lecturer
 Michael Hodges (producer), American singer-songwriter, record producer, composer, executive music producer and music executive
 Mike Hodges (1932–2022), English screenwriter, film director, playwright and novelist
 Nicolas Hodges (born 1970), pianist and teacher
 William Hodges (1744–1797), English painter

Math, science and technology
 David A. Hodges (1937–2022), American electrical engineer
 Joseph Lawson Hodges Jr. (1922–2000), American statistician
 Richard Hodges (archaeologist) (born 1952), British archaeologist
 Ronald W. Hodges (1934–2017), American entomologist
 Wilfrid Hodges (born 1941), British mathematician

Law
 Ralph B. Hodges (1930–2013), American attorney, Justice of the Oklahoma Supreme Court
 Robert H. Hodges Jr. (born 1944), American federal judge
 William Hodges (judge) (1808–1868), English barrister and legal reporter
 William H. Hodges (1929-2017), retired Virginia Court of Appeals judge and state legislator
 William Terrell Hodges (1934-2022), United States District Judge

Military
 Ben Hodges (born 1958), retired United States Army officer who served as lieutenant general
 Courtney Hodges (1887–1966), American military officer
 Lewis Hodges (1918–2007), Royal Air Force pilot

Politics and business
 Frank Hodges (trade unionist) (1887–1947), English trade union leader and Member of Parliament
 Gene Hodges (1936-2014), American politician
 James Hodges (mayor) (1822–1885), American politician and businessman
 Jim Hodges (born 1956), American politician
 Kaneaster Hodges Jr. (1938-2022), American politician
 Luther H. Hodges (1898–1974), American politician
 Luther H. Hodges Jr. (born 1936), American politician and banker
 Max Hodges (born 1917), Australian politician
 Valarie Hodges (born 1955), American politician
 W. Randolph Hodges (1914–2005), American politician
 Richard Hodges (American politician), (born 1963)
 Sir William Hodges, 1st Baronet (1645–1714), English merchant in London and politician

Sports
 Bill Hodges (born 1943), American basketball coach
 Bucky Hodges (born 1995), American football player
 Christiana Hodges, married name of Christiana Willes (1786–1873), English cricketer
 Craig Hodges (born 1960), American basketball player
 Curtis Hodges (born 1999), American football player
 Dave Hodges (rugby union) (born 1968), rugby player
 Devon Hodges (born 1984), Jamaican football player
 Devlin Hodges (born 1996), American football player
 Frank Hodges (footballer) (1891–1985), English football player
 Gil Hodges (1924–1972), American baseball player and manager
 Glyn Hodges (born 1963), Welsh football player and manager
 Jayden Hodges (born 1993), Australian rugby player
 Jehoida Hodges (1876–1930), Welsh rugby player
 John Hodges (1855–1933), Australian cricketer
 John Hodges (footballer) (born 1980), English football player
 Justin Hodges (born 1982), Australian rugby player
 Kevin Hodges (born 1960), English football player and manager
 Lee Hodges (footballer, born 1973), English football player and manager
 Lee Hodges (footballer, born 1978), English football player
 Leleith Hodges (born 1953), Jamaican sprinter
 Len Hodges (1920–1959), football player
 Ron Hodges (born 1949), American baseball player
 Russ Hodges (1910–1971), American sportscaster
 Wes Hodges (born 1984), American baseball player

Other
 Corey J. Hodges (born 1970), African-American preacher and columnist
 H. A. Hodges (1905-1976), British philosopher and theologian
 Honestie Hodges (2006–2020), American teenager who influenced law enforcement policy
 Noel Hodges (1849-1928), British Anglican bishop in India
 Walter Hodges (academic) (died 1757), English academic administrator

Fictional characters
 ARP Warden William Hodges, from the British television series Dad's Army
 David Hodges (CSI), from CSI: Crime Scene Investigation
 Jonas Hodges, a minor character from the American television series 24
 Bob Hodges, a LAPD Police Officer from the movie Colors

See also
 Hodge (surname)

English-language surnames
Patronymic surnames
Surnames from given names